Clowhom Lake is a reservoir  in the Sechelt Inlet basin, located on the Clowhom River at the upper end of Salmon Inlet, the southern side-inlet of Sechelt Inlet.  Formed by Clowhom Dam, the reservoir was formerly two lakes, Upper Clowhom Lake and Lower Clowhom Lake, and had been referred to prior to their merger from inundation as the Clowhom Lakes.

References

https://www.lakepedia.com/lake/clowhom-bc.html

External links
aerial image of Clowhom dam and powerhouse, BC Hydro website
Aerial image of Clowhom dam and powerhouse, BC Hydro website

Reservoirs in British Columbia
Sunshine Coast (British Columbia)
Lakes of British Columbia
Pacific Ranges
New Westminster Land District